Vlad Filat Cabinet may refer to:
First Filat Cabinet, the first Cabinet of Moldova (2009-2011)
Second Filat Cabinet, the second Cabinet of Moldova (2011-2013)